Semage Salman Kulatileke (18 August 1907 – 14 September 1979) was a Sri Lankan judge and member of the Parliament of Sri Lanka.

Early life and education  
Semage Salman Kulatileke was born on 18 August 1907 in Galle. His primary education was at Mahinda College in Galle before he received a Governor's scholarship to study at Royal College, Colombo. He then entered University College London where he studied law and obtained his BA. He was admitted to the Bar as an advocate in September 1937.

Legal career
Having started his legal practice in the unofficial bar in Colombo, in 1949, he joined the Ceylon Judicial Service and was appointed Additional Magistrate, Colombo. He later served as the District Judge of Tangalle and thereafter Kurunegala.

Political career
Kulatileke was elected to the Colombo Municipal Council and served as a municipal councilor until 1949. In 1970, he was appointed to Parliament by the Governor General of Ceylon as one of six appointed members.

Family
His daughter married Nanda Mathew.

See also
List of political families in Sri Lanka

References

1907 births
1979 deaths
Alumni of Mahinda College
Alumni of Royal College, Colombo
Colombo municipal councillors
Members of the 7th Parliament of Ceylon
Government ministers of Sri Lanka
People from Galle
Ceylonese advocates
Sinhalese lawyers
Sinhalese politicians
Sri Lanka Freedom Party politicians